The 1967 Southeast Asian Peninsular Games, officially known as the 4th Southeast Asian Peninsular Games, was a Southeast Asian multi-sport event held in Bangkok, Thailand from 9 to 16 December 1967 with 16 sports featured in the games. Cambodia once again declined to host this edition of the games, as it did in 1963. This was Thailand's second time hosting the Southeast Asian Games, and its first time since the 1959 inaugural games. The games was opened and closed by Bhumibol Adulyadej, the King of Thailand at the Suphachalasai Stadium. The final medal tally was led by host Thailand, followed by Singapore and Malaysia.

The games

Participating nations

 
 
 
 
 
  (host)

Sports

Medal table

Key

References

External links
 History of the SEA Games
 Medal Tally 1959-1995
 Medal Tally
 OCA SEA Games
 SEA Games previous medal table
 SEAGF Office  
 SEA Games members

Southeast Asian Peninsular Games
Southeast Asian Peninsular Games
Southeast Asian Peninsular Games
Southeast Asian Peninsular Games
Southeast Asian Games in Thailand
Southeast Asian Games by year
Southeast Asian Peninsular Games